Parliamentary elections were held in Greece on 19 August 1928. The result was a victory for the Liberal Party, which won 178 of the 250 seats.

Background
The Venizelists entered the elections as a coalition of five "parties of the liberals" under the leadership of Eleftherios Venizelos. These parties were the Democratic Union (later the Agricultural and Labour Party) under the leadership of Alexandros Papanastasiou, the National Democratic Party led by Georgios Kondylis, the Conservative Democratic Party under Andreas Michalakopoulos and the Progressive Union under the leadership of Konstantinos Zavitsanos. Because he wanted to follow an independent line from Venizelos, Georgios Kafantaris together with some personal friends and various dissatisfied liberals founded the Progressive Party.

The anti-Venizelist movement went into the elections divided as the People's Party, the Freethinkers' Party and a few independent royalists who put themselves up for election. The former dictator, Theodoros Pangalos, stood for election in Athens as chief of the National Union. In addition there were a large number of unaligned and independent candidates. Finally, the Communist Party of Greece entered the elections as the United Front.

Results

References

Parliamentary elections in Greece
Greece
Legislative election
1920s in Greek politics
Eleftherios Venizelos
History of Greece (1924–1941)
Greece
Election and referendum articles with incomplete results
Legl